Maqbool Sherwani was a  National Conference member who delayed the invasion of Pashtuns tribesmen from Pakistan in Baramulla, Kashmir in October 1947. In this manner, he played an important role in buying time for Indian Army's Sikh Regiment troops who landed in Srinagar once the accession was accepted. Sherwani was killed by the tribesmen.

Role in October 1947
Maqbool spotted tribesmen planning to invade Kashmir. He misguided them to a wrong path when asked to guide them to the road to Srinagar Airport. He was crucified by the angry rebel forces when they realised that he misguided them to delay their march. Maqbool Sherwani is considered as a hero by Indian Army.

Legacy
In his memory, at Maqbool Sherwani Auditorium and Mohammad Maqbool Sherwani Memorial in Baramulla, tributes are paid by Kashmiris and government officials. The Balidan Stambh monument by Jammu and Kashmir Light Infantry also bears the name of Maqbool Sherwani. Writer Mulk Raj Anand wrote an account of Maqbool Sherwani's story in his novel, Death Of A Hero. Anand's novel was adapted into an Indian television show, Maqbool Ki Vaapsi, which aired on DD Kashir in 2011.

See also
Indo-Pakistani War of 1947–1948
Instrument of Accession (Jammu and Kashmir)
Mohammad Usman
Rajinder Singh (brigadier)
Abdul Hamid (soldier)
Jammu & Kashmir National Conference
Jammu and Kashmir (princely state)#End of the princely state
Kashmir conflict#Accession

References 

Year of birth missing
1947 deaths
People of the Indo-Pakistani War of 1947
Jammu and Kashmir (princely state)
Kashmir conflict
20th-century Indian Muslims
20th-century Indian people